Mio Isayama (諫山実生, Tokyo, 7 June 1980) is a Japanese singer.

Biography 
Mio Isayama debuted as a singer in 2002 under the EMI Music Japan label with the song for NHK's program Minna no Uta. Since then, she has had two other songs featured on the program, including her most popular hit, Tsuki no Waltz, which was described as "probably among the best pieces made for the show in the last few years."

Discography

Albums

References

1980 births
Living people
Singers from Tokyo
21st-century Japanese singers